
Laguna Bravo is a seasonal lake in the Yacuma Province, Beni Department, Bolivia. At an elevation of 167 m, its surface area is 25.7 km².

Lakes of Beni Department